Pozharan (in Albanian), or Požaranje (in Serbian; Пожарање) is a town in the Vitina Municipality, southeast Kosovo.

History
Until 1975, it was known as Požeranje (Пожерање) and had been the seat of its municipality to that time.

Demographics
According to the 2011 census the population is 10,000, of which 99,53% are ethnic Albanians.

Sports
The local football club is KF Vllaznia Pozheran, who played in the Football Superleague of Kosovo in the 2017–18 season.

Notable people 
 Sinan Hasani, Yugoslav politician
  Mejdi Korrani (d. 19/4/1999), KLA
 Xhevat Qerimi, KLA commander
 Naser e Jeton Rama, KLA
Festim Alidema Football 
Sami Piraj, composer
Lindita Halimi, singer

References

Villages in Viti, Kosovo